The 2015 season was the Seattle Seahawks' 40th in the National Football League (NFL) and their sixth under head coach Pete Carroll.

The Seahawks started the season 2–4, after blowing a number of fourth quarter leads, but they then proceeded to win eight of their last ten games, finishing the season 10–6 and clinching the #6 seed in the NFC playoffs. This marked the fourth consecutive season in which the Seahawks secured double digit wins. However, after a Week 10 loss to the Arizona Cardinals, the Seahawks failed to improve on their 12–4 record from 2014. Additionally, the Seahawks failed to win their third consecutive NFC West title after the Cardinals' Week 15 win over the Philadelphia Eagles. During their winning streak, the team clinched a playoff spot with a Week 15 win over the Cleveland Browns. In a five-game winning streak between Weeks 10 and 15, quarterback Russell Wilson posted a passer rating of over 120 in each game, the longest such streak in league history. Wilson led the NFL in passer rating for the season.

The Seahawks defeated the Minnesota Vikings in the Wild Card round after the Vikings blew a potential game-winning field goal attempt. In the Divisional round, the Seahawks fell behind 31–0 to the Carolina Panthers at halftime and ultimately lost 31–24, ending their hopes of becoming the first team since the 1990–1993 Buffalo Bills to appear in three consecutive Super Bowls.

This season marked the fourth year in a row that Seattle's defense ranked first in scoring defense. The only other team to accomplish this feat were the Cleveland Browns of the 1950s.

2015 draft class

Draft trades
 The Seahawks traded their first-round selection (No. 31 overall) and center Max Unger to the New Orleans Saints in exchange for the Saints' fourth-round selection (No. 112 overall) and tight end Jimmy Graham.
 The Seahawks acquired an additional sixth-round selection (No. 181 overall) in a trade that sent wide receiver Percy Harvin to the Jets.
 The Seahawks traded their original sixth-round selection (No. 207 overall) to the Indianapolis Colts in exchange for cornerback Marcus Burley.
 The Seahawks traded their third-round selection (No. 95 overall), fourth-round selection acquired from the Saints (No. 112 overall), fifth-round selection (No. 167 overall), and sixth-round selection acquired from the Jets (No. 181 overall) for the Washington Redskins' third-round selection (No. 69 overall), used to draft wide receiver Tyler Lockett.

Staff

Final roster

Starters in bold.
(*) Denotes players that were selected for the 2016 Pro Bowl.

Schedule

Preseason

Regular season

Note: Intra-division opponents are in bold text.

Postseason

Game summaries

Regular season

Week 1: at St. Louis Rams

The Seahawks opened the season in St. Louis to take on the Rams. In the first quarter, rookie Tyler Lockett returned a punt for 57 yards for a touchdown to give the Seahawks the game's first points. Jimmy Graham made his Seahawks debut,  catching a pass for 7 yards for a touchdown, as the Seahawks were now trailing the Rams, 24–21, in the 3rd quarter. However, without safety Kam Chancellor, Seattle's defense struggled all game. The loss of their defensive captain was too steep to overcome as they would go on to lose in overtime, 34–31, after Greg Zuerlein hit a 37-yard field goal with 12:06 remaining.

With the loss, the Seahawks dropped to 0–1.

Week 2: at Green Bay Packers

After a tough opening loss to the St. Louis Rams, the Seahawks traveled to Green Bay to take on the Packers. The Packers struck first blood, scoring the game's first 10 points. Then, the Seahawks and Packers traded field goals, and the Packers led 13–3 at halftime. The Seahawks scored two unanswered touchdowns to take a 17–13 lead in the third quarter. However, the Packers proceeded to score the final 14 points of the game and won, 27–17, sending the Seahawks to their second consecutive loss of the young season.

With the loss, the Seahawks dropped to 0–2. It was the first double digit loss for the Seahawks in the Wilson era and tied their largest loss since Week 9 of the 2011 season, when they lost by 10 points to the Dallas Cowboys.

Week 3: vs. Chicago Bears

After playing (and losing) their first two games of the season on the road, the Seahawks went home to face the winless Chicago Bears, hoping to avoid an 0–3 start. The game saw the return of Kam Chancellor after his holdout. Marshawn Lynch, for the most part, was not a factor, and he finished with just five carries. He left the game with a pulled hamstring. The Seahawks got a boost from their special teams. Tyler Lockett returned the second half kickoff 105 yards for a touchdown to give Seattle a 13–0 lead. Also, Richard Sherman was used as a punt returner and returned it for 67 yards. In the end, the Seahawks dominated the Bears, 26–0, thereby avoiding an 0–3 start.

With the win, the Seahawks earned their first win of the season and improved to 1–2.

Week 4: vs. Detroit Lions

After easily defeating the Bears, the Seahawks remained at home to face the winless Detroit Lions. The Seahawks led 13–3 heading into the 4th quarter. Wilson was sacked and fumbled, and the Lions defense ran it back for a touchdown, cutting the deficit to 13–10. After the Seahawks' offense had a 3 and out, the Lions had the ball at their 10-yard line. They reached the red zone a few minutes later. On 3rd and 1, Stafford completed a pass to Calvin Johnson, who reached the Seahawks' 1 yard line and attempted to reach out and score the go ahead touchdown. As Johnson was brought down, Kam Chancellor stripped the ball from him. K.J. Wright then knocked the ball out of the back of the end zone. The referees ruled it a touchback, giving the Seahawks the ball back on their 20-yard line. The Seahawks ran two plays, forcing the Lions to burn their timeouts. On 3rd and 2, Wilson completed a pass to Kearse, gaining the first down.  With no timeouts remaining, the Seahawks kneeled, ran out the clock, and ended the game, winning 13–10. As a result, the Lions dropped to 0–4. Wright's bat play caused controversy afterwards. Minutes after the game ended, the NFL VP of officiating ruled that Wright illegally batted the ball out of the back of endzone. Had the call been made, a penalty would have been assessed that gave the Lions a 1st down at the spot of the fumble, plus half the distance to the goal (6–inch line). The officiating crew was heavily criticized by analysts, fans, and players following the missed call.  Several comparisons were immediately made to the Seahawks' controversial victory over the Green Bay Packers in Week 3 of the 2012 season, which also happened on Monday Night Football. In the postgame press conference, Carroll admitted that Wright intentionally batted the ball out of the back of the endzone, and Wright confirmed it. Chancellor said that he did not see the controversial play.

The Seahawks improved to 2–2.

Week 5: at Cincinnati Bengals

After defeating the Bears and Lions (both winless teams) at home to get to .500, the Seahawks traveled to Cincinnati to take on the 4–0 Bengals. In the 3rd quarter, a 23-yard fumble returned for a touchdown by Bobby Wagner allowed the Seahawks to take a commanding 24–7 lead. The Seahawks, however, allowed the Bengals to score the final 20 points of the game, capped by Bengals kicker Mike Nugent kicking the game-winning field goal in overtime. It's the first time since 2004 that the Seahawks blew a 17–point lead. During that stretch, they were 71–0 when holding a 17–point lead.

With the loss, the Seahawks dropped to 2–3. Additionally, they dropped to 0–2 in overtime games (losing both by game–winning field goals).

Week 6: vs. Carolina Panthers

After losing a heartbreaker in Cincinnati to the Bengals, the Seahawks returned home to face their second undefeated team in a row, the 4–0 Carolina Panthers. With 11:51 remaining in the 4th quarter, the Seahawks led the Panthers, 23–14. However, for the fourth time this season, the Seahawks failed to win while holding a 4th quarter lead. The Panthers went on to score the final 13 points of the game, winning 27–23.  The Seahawks lost only their third home game since the team drafted Wilson (28–3 home record), having lost to the Cardinals in Week 16 of the 2013 season and the Cowboys in Week 6 of the 2014 season.

With the loss, the Seahawks dropped to 2–4.

Up to this point, they were in 3rd place in the NFC West (due to tiebreakers).

Week 7: at San Francisco 49ers

After blowing four 4th quarter leads and only winning against two teams with losing records, the Seahawks traveled to Santa Clara to take on the 49ers. The Seahawks easily defeated their former arch-rivals, 20–3. Seahawks running back Marshawn Lynch compiled 122 rushing yards and 1 rushing touchdown on 27 carries. 49ers quarterback Colin Kaepernick struggled once again against the vaunted Legion of Boom, going 13-24 with 124 passing yards, 0 passing touchdowns, and 0 interceptions. Seahawks quarterback Russell Wilson was efficient again, completing 18 passes out of 24 attempts for 235 passing yards with 1 passing touchdown and 2 interceptions.

With the win, the Seahawks improved to 3–4. Additionally, Wilson improved to 6–2 against the 49ers (including postseason), extending his winning streak against them to four games.

Week 8: at Dallas Cowboys

After dominating the 49ers in California, the Seahawks traveled to Dallas to take on the Cowboys. Seattle's only touchdown was a 22-yard pass from Russell Wilson to Luke Willson to give Seattle a 10–3 lead. Late in the second quarter, Ricardo Lockette left the game with an apparent injury after taking a brutal hit by Jeff Heath. Steven Hauschka hit the game-winning field goal for the 13–12 Seahawks' victory.

A day later, the Seahawks announced that Ricardo Lockette underwent season-ending neck surgery and miss the rest of the season. This injury proved to be career-ending.

With the win, the Seahawks improved to 4–4.

At this point, all of their wins have come against teams with losing records.

Week 9: Bye week
No game. Seattle had a bye week.

Week 10: vs. Arizona Cardinals

After the bye week, the Seahawks hosted the Arizona Cardinals in their second Sunday Night Football game of the season.

Late in the first quarter, Earl Thomas intercepted Carson Palmer in the end zone as Palmer attempted to give Arizona the game's first points. This was Thomas' third interception of the season.

Early in the second quarter, Russell Wilson recovered a fumble to give the Cardinals a safety after the ball bounced to the back of the end zone and Wilson being able to recover it after a bad snap. Trailing 19–0 late in the second quarter, the Seahawks turned to fullback Will Tukuafu to give Seattle the first touchdown of the game. This was Tukuafu's first NFL touchdown.

The Seahawks defense struggled to stop the Cardinals offense all game, especially the running game in the fourth quarter. The Seahawks defense allowed 39 total points. It was the most points they allowed in a game since November 28, 2010 against the Kansas City Chiefs.

This was the first time that the Seahawks lost two home games in a season in the Wilson era. Over the previous three seasons, the Seahawks had not lost more than one home game in each season.

With the loss, the Seahawks dropped to 4–5. This marked the fifth time this season that the Seahawks could not hold on to a 4th quarter lead.

Week 11: vs. San Francisco 49ers

After blowing yet another 4th quarter lead, the Seahawks hosted the San Francisco 49ers. Blaine Gabbert was now the 49ers' starting quarterback, replacing Colin Kaepernick, who was placed on IR. Although Marshawn Lynch did not play, the Seahawks relied on Thomas Rawls. He finished the game with 255 total yards. All four of the Seahawks' touchdowns were scored by rookies as Tyler Lockett and Thomas Rawls both put up a pair of touchdowns in the win. Again, Russell Wilson was efficient, going 24–29 with 260 passing yards and 3 passing touchdowns.

With the win, the Seahawks improved to 5–5. Additionally, Wilson improved to 7–2 against the 49ers (including postseason), extending his winning streak against them to five games.

Week 12: vs. Pittsburgh Steelers

After handling the 49ers at home, the Seahawks hosted the Pittsburgh Steelers for the first time since the 2003 season. Richard Sherman, who has not intercepted a pass in the first 12 games of the season, recorded his first in the third quarter. The game was a shootout as Russell Wilson, playing on his 27th birthday, passed for 345 yards and threw five touchdown passes (three of them to wide receiver Doug Baldwin). Steelers quarterback Ben Roethlisberger passed for 456 yards against the Seahawks' defense, which were the most passing yards the Seahawks have ever allowed to an opposing quarterback until Matt Schaub's 460 yards passing surpassed it in 2019.

With the win, the Seahawks improved to 6–5 and earned their first win of the season against a team with a winning record.

The victory was bittersweet, however, as Jimmy Graham suffered an apparent leg injury in the third quarter. It was later revealed that Graham tore the patellar tendon in his knee. The Seahawks announced afterwards that Graham would undergo surgery and miss the rest of the season.

Week 13: at Minnesota Vikings

Coming off huge home wins against the 49ers and Steelers, the Seahawks traveled to Minneapolis to take on the Minnesota Vikings. Despite being without both Marshawn Lynch and Jimmy Graham, the Seahawks dominated the Vikings 38–7. Going into the game, the Vikings were previously 8–3 and leading the NFC North, led the NFL in team rushing yards, and Adrian Peterson was the NFL's leading rusher. The Seahawks defense held Peterson to only 18 yards and the Vikings' offense failed to score (their only points coming on a special-teams kickoff return), while Russell Wilson and the Seattle offense racked up 433 yards, five total touchdowns, and no interceptions.

Week 14: at Baltimore Ravens

After easily handling the Vikings in Minneapolis, the Seahawks traveled to Baltimore to take on the Ravens. Russell Wilson's streak of games with greater than a 135 passer rating continued as he again tied the franchise mark of five touchdown passes to go with zero interceptions. Doug Baldwin's success over the same span also continued as he hauled in three passes for touchdowns. Early in the game, running back Thomas Rawls and safety Kam Chancellor left the game with injuries. With Rawls now out for the year with a broken left ankle, the Seahawks turned to DuJuan Harris. Harris was limited to just 42 rushing yards on 18 carries.

With the win, the Seahawks improved to 8–5. Furthermore, the Seahawks' all–time franchise regular season win–loss record improved to 313–312–0. This marks the first time ever in team history that the Seahawks have had an overall winning regular season win–loss record (a win–loss record above .500).

Week 15: vs. Cleveland Browns

After a huge win against the Ravens in Baltimore, the Seahawks returned home to host the Cleveland Browns. Russell Wilson's streak continued: Over the last five games he threw for 19 touchdowns and zero interceptions. Doug Baldwin compiled 10 touchdowns over the last four games, which has only been achieved one other time (Jerry Rice in 1987).
With the injury of Thomas Rawls the week prior Derrick Coleman got the start at running back but Christine Michael took the majority of the carries.

With the win, the Seahawks improved to 9–5 and clinched a playoff spot after winning five straight games. Furthermore, the Seahawks' all–time franchise regular season win–loss record improved to 314–312–0. This marks the first time ever in team history that the Seahawks have had an overall regular season win–loss record of at least two games above .500.

Week 16: vs. St. Louis Rams

After easily defeating the Cleveland Browns at home, the Seahawks remained at home to host the St. Louis Rams. Doug Baldwin's touchdown reception in the third quarter surpasses Daryl Turner's mark set in 1985 for the most receiving touchdowns by a Seahawk in a single season with 14.

With the loss, the Seahawks drop to 9–6, snapping a five-game winning streak. The Rams have swept the season series for the first time since 2004.

This marks the first time in 71 games (including postseason) the Seahawks have not held the lead at any point during the game. This is also the first such instance during the Wilson era. Prior to this game, the Seahawks have held the lead at least once during the game for an NFL-record 70 consecutive games (including postseason). Additionally, the Seahawks' 25-game streak of having 100 rushing yards as a team (another NFL record) came to an end.

Week 17: at Arizona Cardinals

In their final game of the regular season, the Seahawks routed the Arizona Cardinals 36–6, holding the Cardinals' then number one scoring offense to only six points, allowing the Seahawks to finish as the number one scoring defense for the fourth consecutive season, an NFL record. During the game, Russell Wilson set two franchise records passing: 4,024 yards in a season, topping Matt Hasselbeck's 3,966 yards set in 2007, and 34 touchdowns through the air, surpassing Dave Krieg's 32 touchdowns in 1984. Helping Wilson get the franchise record for passing touchdowns in a season was Doug Baldwin, as he was the co-leader for touchdown receptions in the 2015 season with 14 touchdowns.

Postseason

Seattle entered the postseason as the #6 seed in the NFC.

NFC Wild Card Playoffs: at #3 Minnesota Vikings

The #6 seeded Seahawks traveled to Minnesota to face the #3 seeded Vikings in a game that was the third coldest in NFL history as the two teams squared off in subzero temperatures. The field goal filled contest came down to a Vikings 27-yard field goal with 26 seconds left in the fourth quarter but the kick went wide-left giving the Seahawks the victory.

NFC Divisional Playoffs: at #1 Carolina Panthers

The Seahawks traveled to Charlotte to face the #1 seeded Carolina Panthers.  The Panthers scored early and often in the first half, going into halftime with a 31–0 lead.  The Seahawks fought back aggressively in the second half, cutting the lead to only one possession and holding the Panthers from scoring in the second half, but fell short of a victory after the Panthers successfully recovered an onside kick and kneeled out the clock, with a final score of 31–24.

It was Marshawn Lynch's final game as he announced his retirement on February 7, 2016. He was held to just 20 rushing yards. However, Lynch would return to the NFL in April 2017 as a member of the Oakland Raiders before returning to the Seahawks in December 2019.

Standings

Division

Conference

References

External links
 

Seattle
Seattle Seahawks seasons
Seattle Seahawks